Andrew McKenna Jr. is a former chairman of the Illinois Republican Party. McKenna became the chairman in 2005, and stepped down in August 2009.  He was succeeded by Pat Brady. He was preceded by Judy Baar Topinka.

He is the son of Andrew J. McKenna, chairman of McDonald's since 2004.

McKenna ran in the 2004 Republican primary for U.S. Senate and the 2010 Republican primary election for governor.

References 

University of Notre Dame alumni
Kellogg School of Management alumni
Illinois Republicans
Illinois Republican Party chairs
Living people
1956 births